Tápiószele is a town in Pest county, Hungary.

Notable residents
Marcsa Simon (1882–1954), actress.
Samu Börtsök (1881–1931), painter.
János Gyarmati (1910–1974), footballer and football coach.

External links
 Town's official website 

Populated places in Pest County